Macrosoma napiaria is a moth-like butterfly in the family Hedylidae. It was described by Achille Guenée in 1857.

References

Hedylidae
Butterflies described in 1857